John Frederick Nims (November 20, 1913 in Muskegon, Michigan – January 13, 1999, aged 85, in Chicago, Illinois) was an American poet and academic.

Life
He graduated from DePaul University, University of Notre Dame with an M.A., and from the University of Chicago with a Ph.D. in 1945. 
He published reviews of the works by Robert Lowell and W. S. Merwin. He taught English at Harvard University, the University of Florence, the University of Toronto, Williams College, University of Missouri, and the University of Illinois at Chicago.

He was editor of Poetry magazine from 1978 to 1984.

The John Frederick Nims Memorial Prize, for poetry translation, is awarded by the Poetry Foundation.

Awards
 American Academy of Arts and Letters grant
 National Foundation for the Arts and Humanities grant
 Institute of the Humanities fellowship 
 1982 Academy of American Poets fellowship
 1986 Guggenheim Fellowship
 1991 Aiken Taylor Award for Modern American Poetry.
 1993 O.B. Hardison Prize

Bibliography
The Powers Of Heaven And Earth: New And Selected Poems (Louisiana State University Press, 2002)

Zany in Denim (University of Arkansas Press, 1990)
, selected for the New York Public Library's Ninety from the Nineties.
The Kiss: A Jambalaya (1982)

Of Flesh and Bone (1967)
Knowledge of the Evening (1960), which was nominated for a National Book Award
A Fountain in Kentucky (1950)

Five Young American Poets (1944)

Anthologies

Translations
Euripides: Four Tragedies (1958)
Sappho to Valery: Poems in Translation (1971)

Western Wind: An Introduction to Poetry (1983)

Editor
Ovid's Metamorphoses: The Arthur Golding Translation of 1567 (1965)

Criticism

References

External links

1913 births
1999 deaths
20th-century American poets
Poets from Michigan
People from Muskegon, Michigan
University of Chicago alumni
Harvard University faculty
Academic staff of the University of Florence
University of Missouri faculty